The 2015 FIL European Luge Championships took place under the auspices of the International Luge Federation at Sochi, Russia from 27 February to 1 March 2015.

Medalists

Medal table

References 

FIL European Luge Championships
FIL European Luge Championships
FIL European Luge Championships
Luge competitions in Russia
International sports competitions hosted by Russia
Sports competitions in Sochi
European Luge Championships
European Luge Championships